Frank Konigsberg (March 10, 1933 – November 12, 2016) was an American lawyer, television producer and agent. He became the second largest shareholder of ICM Partners, and he subsequently served as the president of Telepictures. He was nominated for an Emmy nine times.

Early life
Frank Konigsberg was born on March 10, 1933. He graduated from Yale University and Yale Law School.

Career
Konigsberg started his career as a lawyer for CBS. He later worked for the International Famous Agency. He was Bing Crosby's agent. In 1975, he joined ICM Partners and became its second largest shareholder after Marvin Josephson. Meanwhile, he also founded Konigsberg Co., merged it with Telepictures Productions in 1983 and subsequently served as the president of Telepictures until its merger with Lorimar in 1986. With producer Larry Sanitsky, he co-founded Konigsberg Sanitsky, a television production company.

Konisberg worked as a producer on Breaking Away, Rituals, The Tommyknockers, Gene Kelly: An American in Pasadena, Bing Crosby: His Life and Legend, Charles and Diana: Unhappily Ever After, Jesus, William & Kate, Ellis Island, Ben Hur and Titanic. He received nine Emmy Award nominations for his work on The Guyana Tragedy, The Last Don, The Oldest Living Confederate Widow Tells All and Children of the Dust.

Personal life and death
Konigsberg had a wife, Susanne. He died on November 12, 2016.

References

1933 births
2016 deaths
Yale Law School alumni
California lawyers
American television producers
Deaths from leukemia
20th-century American lawyers